Rivière des Vases may refer to:

Rivière des Vases (Nicolet River tributary), Ham-Nord, Arthabaska Regional County Municipality, Quebec, Canada
Rivière des Vases (L'Isle-Verte), a tributary of St. Lawrence River, L'Isle-Verte, Quebec, Canada